The Port Au Port Group is a geologic group in Newfoundland and Labrador. It preserves fossils dating back to the Cambrian period.

See also

 List of fossiliferous stratigraphic units in Newfoundland and Labrador

References

 

Cambrian Newfoundland and Labrador